A highway location marker is the modern-day equivalent of a milestone. Unlike traditional milestones, however, which (as their name suggests) were originally carved from stone and sited at one-mile intervals, modern highway location markers are made from a variety of materials and are almost invariably spaced at intervals of a kilometre or a fraction thereof (except in the United States, and United Kingdom where miles are used on roadways). In some countries they may be known as driver location signs, milestones or kilometre stones.

Route identification 
Until the beginning of the twentieth century, highways were usually named rather than numbered. 
In most cases they had the name of the town or city to which they headed, for example The Old Portsmouth Road.  Other ancient highway names include The Pilgrims Way,  Watling Street and the Via Appia.

However, with the increase in private traffic after the First World War a simpler way of identifying roads was needed. Different countries adopted different ways of identifying roads. Under the 1966 Local Government Act Great Britain [excluding Northern Ireland] adopted a system of road numbering so that each roads had a unique number across the entire country. The relative importance of the road was identified by a “A” or a “B” prefix.

In France roads that were in the care of the national government were prefixed by “RN” (later just “N”) and had a number that was unique across all of France. Roads that were maintained by departments had a number that was prefixed by “D” and were unique within the department concerned while roads that were maintained by communes had numbers that were prefixed by a “C” were unique within a commune. The advent of motorways meant an extension to both the British and the French methods of roads identification.

Highway location markers often have the route identifier marked on them.

Location identification 
Location identification is achieved by the highway location markers having numbers on them – usually the distance from some reference point.

A highway may be divided into more than one sector, with different sector having different numbering sequences (though it is possible, as will be explained later for two sectors to share a sequence). Sector boundaries could be the boundaries of a state (as is the case of the United States Interstate highway system), or could be the middle of a large town or any one of a number of other locations.

Each numbering sequence is defined by its reference point and all the numbers within one sequence having a fixed relationship to the reference point and hence to each other (such as being at 0.1 km intervals). The reference point might be the start of the highway, it might be the start of the sector or it might be some artificial point that is located before the start of the highway. Such artificial points include the Zero Milestone in Washington, D.C. and Charing Cross in London.

In some countries such as Spain or the United States, highway exit numbers are identified using location identifiers.

Rerouting problems 
If a highway is rerouted, then invariably its length changes.  This can be handled in one of three ways:

 Location identifiers can be adjusted to take the rerouting into account. This is often impractical.
 The new section of road can be given a new identifier. This is often done in Italy.
 The sequence can be broken.  Any adjustments in the sequence are recorded using the milepost equation.

Carriageway identification 
Until the advent of dual carriageways, it was seldom necessary to identify the actual carriageway. When this was necessary, the carriageway was often identified informally in terms of the town or city to which the carriageway is heading or by using one of the points of the compass. However, the use of highway location markers to pinpoint accidents made it necessary to identify the correct carriageway in an unambiguous manner so that the emergency services could get to the scene of the accident with minimal delay.

Location marker examples 
These location marker examples have been chosen because each has a novel feature over and above route and location identification.

United Kingdom 

Major British dual-carriageway roads have marker posts at 100-metre intervals. These posts, which are used for administrative purposes, give the distance in kilometres from some reference point. The digits on the posts are not designed to be used by the general public. There are no fixed rules for determining the reference points: they may be the centre of a city, an administrative boundary or follow some other rule. Marker posts on motorways also have arrows that point to the closest emergency telephone.

The advent of the mobile phone required a government rethink regarding marker posts. This has led to the erection of driver location signs in England (but at the time of writing, not in Scotland, Wales or Northern Ireland)

at about 500 metre (about 1/3 mile) intervals on many motorways.

Driver location signs have three pieces of information:

 The road identifier
 The carriageway identifier
 The location

The location is identical to the location given on marker posts. The most commonly used carriageway identifiers are the letters “A”, “B”, “J”, “K”, “L” and “M”.

The letter “A” normally denotes the carriageway in the direction of increasing location numbers (usually away from London), “B” the carriageway in the direction of decreasing location numbers while “J”, “K”, “L” and “M” denote junction slip roads.

Netherlands 

As the name suggests, Dutch hectometre markers are spaced at 100-metre intervals. In addition to showing the motorway number and location, they also bear a carriageway identifier – Li for Links (Left) and Re for Rechts (Right). The carriageways are identified as being left-hand and right-hand as viewed by somebody looking in the direction of increasing location numbers. By and large, Dutch location numbers increase as one moves away from Amsterdam, or in the case of roads that do not originate in Amsterdam, location numbers increase as one moves eastwards away from the North Sea. Carriageway identifiers “a”, “b”, “c” and “d” are used to identify slip roads on and off the motorway.

Another novel concept on Dutch hectometre markers is that speed limits are displayed on the marker boards when the speed limit is less than the (previous) national default of 120 km/h. This is shown on the accompanying illustration. Pictures of the normal boards can be found in the Dutch language article.

United States 

Except in California (discussed below), mileposts are placed on interstate highways (and other major routes in some states) at one-mile intervals that indicate the distance through a state.  Mileposts normally start at the western or southern point of entry of the route into the state, or the southern or western terminus of the route within the state, and increase heading north or east.  Many states have added supplemental reference markers that indicate distance in fractional miles (tenth, quarter, half, etc.) in addition to mileposts for whole miles, either across the entire state or in select regions of the state.

California 

California uses a postmile system on all of its state highways, including U.S. Routes and Interstate Highways. The postmile markers indicate the distance a route travels through individual counties, as opposed to mile markers that indicate the distance travelled through a state. Nevada and Ohio use similar county-based mile markers on non-interstates, but use standard mileposts on interstate routes.

New York 

New York reference markers are plates 8 in by 10 in (252 mm by 200 mm) that have three rows of numbers.  Since the lettering is small (60 mm, 2.4 in), they are designed for use by highway engineers rather than motorists.  The first row displays the route number, the second row the NYSDOT Region, and the third row the control segment and distance from the segment start.  The control segment has one digit while the distance from the start of the segment has three digits and is given in units of tenths of a mile.  Vermont uses a similar reference marker system on non-interstate routes.

New England

India 

The Indian location markers carry a number of different distances.  The marker illustrated carries the following information:
National Highway 58
180 kilometres from the start of the highway (in Delhi)
24 kilometres to the next big city - Haridwar
352 kilometres to the last town on the route - Mana, India (which is close to Mana Pass on the Tibetan/Chinese border, the terminus of the route).
Although the sign illustrated uses Latin script, a number of Indian location markers use the Indian official language Hindi or the predominant language of the state in which they are located.

Malaysia 
Malaysia has its own unique set of location markers in kilometre and hectormetre (100-metre intervals). They include the route code, location number from the road starting point and sometimes direction of the carriageway. Green background are for toll expressways and blue backgrounds are for non-tolled highways. On the other hand, federal roads have marker which are placed every kilometre and includes the distance to primary destination and location number.  Every five kilometres however the marker includes the route code, distance to primary destination, distance to secondary destination and location number.

Identifiers on road concurrencies

Roads often have two or more numbers.  This can happen where two highway designations run concurrently, or share the same piece of road for part of their route or when the same road is numbered by two different authorities.  Certain road authorities prefer to only display a single route identifier on their roads, but others display both route identifiers on their roads.

A common example of roads numbering by different authorities is the numbering of the European routes—all such routes have local numbers in addition to the "E number" allocated by the United Nations Economic Commission for Europe (UNECE), though is some cases, such as Sweden, the local route numbers have been changed to match the "E" numbers.

The picture shows a typical route marker in Europe (in this case Belgium) where both the European route number and the national number are displayed on the same location marker.  The style of the route marker, apart from the green E-route indicator, is specific to the country concerned.

See also
 Milestone
 Driver location sign (UK equivalent)

References 

Milestones
Location

pt:Marco quilométrico